The Starting Five is an album by organist Jimmy McGriff recorded in 1986 and released on the Milestone label the following year.

Reception 

Allmusic's Scott Yanow said: "Due to the strong lineup and the basic but perfectly suitable material, this Jimmy McGriff CD is well worth picking up. ... A fun and swinging session".

Track listing
All compositions by Jimmy McGriff except where noted
 "Movin' On" (David Newman) – 7:15
 "Doggone" – 4:28
 "I'm Getting Sentimental Over You" (George Bassman, Ned Washington) – 7:26
 "BGO" – 5:48
 "You Belong to Me" (Chilton Price, Pee Wee King, Redd Stewart) – 4:53
 "Granny's Lane" – 5:41
 "Georgia on My Mind" (Hoagy Carmichael, Stuart Gorrell) – 5:27
 "Hittin' the Jug" (Gene Ammons) – 10:37  Additional track on CD release

Personnel
Jimmy McGriff – organ
Rusty Bryant – alto saxophone, tenor saxophone
David "Fathead" Newman – alto saxophone, tenor saxophone, flute 
Mel Brown, Wayne Boyd (tracks 1-3 & 6) – guitar
Bernard Purdie − drums

References

Milestone Records albums
Jimmy McGriff albums
1987 albums
Albums produced by Bob Porter (record producer)
Albums recorded at Van Gelder Studio